Pterocarpans are derivatives of isoflavonoids found in the family Fabaceae. It is a group of compounds which can be described as benzo-pyrano-furano-benzenes (i.e. 6H-[1]benzofuro[3,2-c]chromene skeleton) which can be formed by coupling of the B ring to the 4-one position.

2'-hydroxyisoflavone reductase is the enzyme responsible for the conversion in Cicer arietinum and glyceollin synthase for the production of glyceollins, phytoalexins in soybean.

Known compounds 

 Bitucarpin A and B, isolated from the aerial parts of Mediterranean plants Bituminaria morisiana and Bituminaria bituminosa
 Erybraedin A and B, isolated from the stems of Erythrina subumbrans and C, isolated from the leaves of Bituminaria morisiana
 Erythrabyssin II, erystagallin A, erythrabissin-1, and erycristagallin isolated from the stems of Erythrina subumbrans
 Glycinol, glyceollidin I and II, glyceollins (glyceollin I, II, III and IV), found in the soybean (Glycine max)
 Glycyrrhizol A, isolated from the root of the Chinese licorice plant (Glycyrrhiza uralensis)
 Maackiain, isolated from the roots of Maackia amurensis subsp. Buergeri
 Medicarpin, found in Medicago truncatula
 Morisianine, isolated from the seeds of Bituminaria morisiana
 Orientanol A, isolated from the wood of Erythrina orientalis
 Phaseolin, found in French bean seeds
 Pisatin, found in Pisum sativum
 Striatine, isolated from aerial parts of Mundulea striata
 Trifolirhizin, found in Sophora flavescens

References

External links 
 Superpathway of pterocarpan biosynthesis (via formononetin) on metacyc.org
 Pterocarpans on the Comparative Toxicogenomics Database

Pterocarpans